こ, in hiragana or コ in katakana, is one of the Japanese kana, each of which represents one mora. Both represent . The shape of these kana comes from the kanji 己.

This character may be supplemented by a dakuten; it becomes ご in hiragana, ゴ in katakana and go in Hepburn romanization.

A handakuten (゜) does not occur with ko in normal Japanese text, but it may be used by linguists to indicate a nasal pronunciation .

Stroke order

Other communicative representations

 Full Braille representation

 Computer encodings

References

See also

 Koto (kana)

Specific kana